Therevinae is a subfamily of stiletto flies in the family Therevidae. More than 20 genera and 470 described species are placed in the Therevinae.

Genera
These 26 genera belong to the subfamily Therevinae:

 Acrosathe Irwin & Lyneborg, 1981
 Ammonaios Irwin & Lyneborg, 1981
 Arenigena Irwin & Lyneborg, 1981
 Brachylinga Irwin & Lyneborg, 1981
 Breviperna Irwin, 1977
 Chromolepida Cole, 1923
 Cyclotelus Walker, 1850
 Dialineura Rondani, 1856
 Dichoglena Irwin & Lyneborg, 1981
 Litolinga Irwin & Lyneborg, 1981
 Lysilinga Irwin & Lyneborg, 1981
 Megalinga Irwin & Lyneborg, 1981
 Melanothereva Malloch, 1932
 Nebritus Coquillett, 1894
 Ozodiceromya Bigot, 1890
 Ozodiceromyia
 Pallicephala Irwin & Lyneborg, 1981
 Pandivirilia Irwin & Lyneborg, 1981
 Penniverpa Irwin & Lyneborg, 1981
 Psilocephala Zetterstedt, 1838
 Rhagioforma Irwin & Lyneborg, 1981
 Spiriverpa Irwin & Lyneborg, 1981
 Tabuda Walker, 1852
 Tabudamima Irwin & Lyneborg, 1981
 Thereva Latreille, 1797
 Viriliricta Irwin & Lyneborg, 1981

References

Further reading

External links

 

Therevidae
Articles created by Qbugbot
Brachycera subfamilies